The Lake Erie College of Osteopathic Medicine (LECOM) is a private medical school in Erie, Pennsylvania, Greensburg, Pennsylvania, Bradenton, Florida, DeFuniak Springs, Florida and Elmira, New York.  Founded in 1992, LECOM confers medical (D.O.), dental (DMD), pharmacy (PharmD), as well as master's degrees in the health sciences. LECOM operates one of the few accelerated three-year pharmacy programs in the country, and is one of 2 pharmacy schools in the country with a distance education program.

With over 2,200 enrolled medical students, the College of Osteopathic Medicine at LECOM is the largest medical school in the United States.

LECOM is accredited by the Middle States Commission on Higher Education, the American Osteopathic Association's Commission on Osteopathic College Accreditation, the Commission on Dental Accreditation, and the Accreditation Council for Pharmacy Education.

History
In the late 1980s, the growing need for new physicians especially in the local area was becoming increasingly evident and as a result, the leaders of Millcreek Community Hospital in Millcreek Township, Pennsylvania founded the health system's now namesake, the Lake Erie College of Osteopathic Medicine, in December 1992. The institution's first courses began in 1993, and the inaugural class of students graduated on May 24 1997. In 2002, the LECOM School of Pharmacy opened.

In 2004, LECOM opened a branch campus in Bradenton, Florida.  In 2007, Lake Erie COM was the first US medical school to re-introduce a three-year medical school program, after the other 3 year programs in the nation had closed.  In 2008, LECOM received approval to open an additional branch campus in Greensburg, Pennsylvania at the site of Seton Hill University, wchich opened in 2009.   The branch campus included two additional buildings, with an overall projected cost of $4 million.

In 2012, the Bradenton campus opened a new dental school. In 2020, LECOM opened a new medical school campus in Elmira, New York. In 2022, they announced the opening of their fifth campus to be located at Jacksonville University in Florida. It is expected to start operations in 2026.

The medical school at LECOM is the largest in the United States.

LECOM announced it will open a new school of podiatric medicine in the fall of 2023 after they received approval from the Council on Podiatric Medical Education. It will become the eleventh podiatric medical school in the United States. 

As of 2022, the college claims a total enrollment of over 4100 students and 16,000 alumni.  LECOM is a member of the LECOM Health system, an academic health center with two hospitals, physician practices, two skilled nursing centers and three independent living centers for older adults.

Academics

Doctor of Osteopathic Medicine
The medical school offers three primary learning pathways: a traditional lecture discussion Program, a problem-based learning program, and a directed study program, as well as two, three-year programs, all leading to the Doctor of Osteopathic Medicine degree.  The Erie campus offers all three primary pathways, while the Bradenton and Greensburg campuses offer curriculum based solely on problem-based learning. Post-graduate residence and fellowship training is managed by the Lake Erie Consortium for Osteopathic Medical Training.

Doctor of Pharmacy
The School of Pharmacy offers three pathways for the Doctor of Pharmacy program. One is a year-round, three-year curriculum based on the Erie campus, while another is a four-year traditional curriculum offered at the Bradenton campus.  In 2014, the School of Pharmacy added a four-year distance education pathway for students across the United States.  LECOM and Creighton University offer the only two distance education pathways for the primary PharmD degree in the nation.

Doctor of Dental Medicine
The School of Dental Medicine (SDM) prepares students for the practice of general dentistry. First-year dental students participate in problem-based learning as they prepare for clinical training. The SDM operates full-service dental practice offices in Bradenton where third-year students treat patients under the supervision of licensed dentists. In May 2015, the School opened outreach training sites in Erie, PA and DeFuniak Springs, FL. Fourth-year dental students complete their clinical training at these offices.

Campuses

Erie 
The main campus is located on West Grandview Boulevard in Erie, Pennsylvania, and overlooks Lake Erie. In 2002, the College expanded the main building with a three-story addition which included classroom, laboratory and office space for the School of Pharmacy.  In 2011, the college purchased the LORD Corporation Technology Center on adjoining property.  The purchase allowed LORD Corporation to keep its Erie operations by moving to a new location just south of the city.  LECOM uses what is now the west campus for the LECOM Erie Dental Offices, research labs, and additional classroom space.

Bradenton 
LECOM Bradenton is located in the managed community of Lakewood Ranch near Sarasota and Bradenton, Florida. The original campus building, containing two large lecture halls and 24 smaller classrooms, houses the College of Osteopathic Medicine and the School of Pharmacy.  The School of Dental Medicine (SDM) is located just north of the original building.  Half of the building houses the classrooms, laboratories and offices for the SDM and the SHSA.  The other side of the building has dental offices where third-year dental students begin clinical training treating patients from the surrounding communities.

Seton Hill 
LECOM at Seton Hill is an extension of the LECOM Erie College of Osteopathic Medicine classes.  Classrooms, laboratories and offices are housed in two buildings on the Seton Hill University campus in Greensburg, Pennsylvania.

Elmira 
LECOM has sent third- and fourth-year medical students to Arnot Health in Elmira and other nearby hospitals for clinical education since 2012. In September 2018, LECOM received accreditation for a second extension in Elmira, NY for the LECOM at Elmira. Construction on a new $20 million, 49,000 square-foot facility began in January 2019. The first 120 students are expected to begin classes in July 2020.

Professional sports partnerships
LECOM officially partnered with the new former Erie BayHawks of the NBA G (Development) League in 2008. As part of those respective deals, LECOM provided medical coverage to both teams. Additionally, the LECOM's name was featured on the BayHawks' jerseys and court design at Erie Insurance Arena. The BayHawks conducted workouts and practices at the LECOM Medical Fitness and Wellness Center. LECOM maintains a similar partnership with the Erie Commodores soccer team.

In February 2017, LECOM purchased the naming rights to LECOM Park (formerly called McKechnie Field), the spring training home of the Pittsburgh Pirates and their Single-A affiliate, the Bradenton Marauders. The deal will span a period of fifteen years.  The college also has educational partnership agreements with the Cleveland Browns and Buffalo Sabres. As part of the Buffalo Sabres deal LECOM and Pegula Sports and Entertainment reached a 10-year deal for naming rights to LECOM Harborcenter in September 2019. It also has sponsorship agreements with the New York Jets, Baltimore Orioles Ed Smith Stadium in Sarasota, Fla., and the New York Yankees Steinbrenner Field in Tampa, Fla.

See also
Medical schools in Pennsylvania
 Osteopathic medicine in the United States

References

Further reading

External links 
 

Medical schools in Pennsylvania
Medical schools in Florida
Pharmacy schools in Pennsylvania
Pharmacy schools in Florida
Osteopathic medical schools in the United States
Private universities and colleges in Florida
Education in Erie, Pennsylvania
Educational institutions established in 1992
Universities and colleges in Erie County, Pennsylvania
Universities using Problem-based learning
Education in Manatee County, Florida
1992 establishments in Pennsylvania
Private universities and colleges in Pennsylvania